Sweden women's national softball team is the national team for Sweden. The team competed at the 1994 ISF Women's World Championship in St. John's, Newfoundland where they finished sixteenth.

References

External links 
 International Softball Federation

Women's national softball teams
S
Softball in Sweden